was a Japanese sinologist noted for his studies of Chinese history and Classical Chinese literature, especially the Book of Documents (Shujing) and Analects of Confucius.

Yoshikawa was awarded many honors for his scholarship, including membership in the Japan Art Academy and he was named a Person of Cultural Merit. In 1969 he was awarded the Prix Stanislas Julien for the entire body of his work.

Life and career
Yoshikawa was born on 18 March 1904 in Kobe, Japan, as the second son of a local merchant.  He entered middle school in 1916 and was introduced to the classics of Chinese history and historical fiction, such as the Records of the Grand Historian, Water Margin, Journey to the West, and Romance of the Three Kingdoms.  In 1920, Yoshikawa entered the Third Advanced School in Kyoto, where he met fellow China enthusiast and future colleague Masaru Aoki and began studying Mandarin Chinese.  In 1923, prior to entering university, Yoshikawa traveled to China, spending time in and around Jiangsu Province.  Yoshikawa's interest in literature increased during this period as he read the works of noted Japanese authors Ryūnosuke Akutagawa and Haruo Satō.

Yoshikawa matriculated at the Department of Literature of Kyoto University in 1923, where he studied Chinese and classical Chinese literature under the guidance of scholars Naoki Kano (1868–1947) and Torao Suzuki (1878–1963). He graduated in 1926 with a thesis on rhythm and prosody in Chinese poetry.  After graduating, Yoshikawa was accepted as a graduate student and began advanced study in Tang poetry.  From 1928 to 1931, Yoshikawa studied in Peking (modern Beijing), where he became friends with fellow sinologist Takeshirō Kuraishi (1897–1975).  Following his six years in China, Yoshikawa returned to Japan where he took up a position at what is now The Kyoto University Research Centre for the Cultural Sciences and taught courses in Kyoto University's Department of Literature.

Yoshikawa was an ardent admirer of Confucius and sought to emulate traditional Chinese Confucian scholars in his personal conduct, even adopting a Chinese courtesy name: Zenshi 善之 (Mandarin: Shànzhī).  In 1932, Yoshikawa married a woman named Nobu Nakamura and bought a home in the Sakyō area of Kyoto, where he and his wife lived together their entire lives.

During the late 1930s and 1940s Yoshikawa and his colleagues worked on editing and translating an edition of the 7th century Chinese work Shangshu zhengyi , a commentary on the Book of Documents written by scholar Kong Yingda.

Selected works
吉川幸次郎 1904-1980 WorldCat Authority page lists 
521 works in 1,296 publications in 3 languages and 5,545 library holdings.
 
 
 
  24 volumes. 16 editions published between 1969 and 1996.

References and further reading

Notes

Japanese sinologists
1904 births
1980 deaths
People from Kobe
Kyoto University alumni
Columbia University faculty